The 1993 President's Cup International Football Tournament was the 19th competition of Korea Cup. It was held from 7 to 16 June 1993.

Group stage

Group A

Group B

Knockout stage

Bracket

Semi-finals

Final

See also
Korea Cup
South Korea national football team results

References

External links
President's Cup 1991 (South Korea) at RSSSF

1991